Angelica Mesiti (born 1976, Sydney) is an Australian video artist of Italian descent known for her large-scale video works. She presently lives and works in Paris.

In 2009 Mesiti was the recipient of the 58th Blake Prize for her 10 minute video work called 'Rapture (silent anthem)', which depicted in slow motion joyful white youths bathed in bright sunlight. She has been exhibiting her work since 2011: venues include the Art Gallery of New South Wales, the 19th Biennale of Sydney, the Perth Institute of Contemporary Arts, Artspace Sydney, the National Gallery of Australia, and the Palais de Tokyo.

She represented Australia at the 2019 Venice Biennale, with a three chanel work called 'ASSEMBLY' filmed in the Senate chambers of Italy and Australia, and projected within an architectural amphitheater. It was selected as a highlight of the exhibition by Artsy and Designboom. Associated Press said the work examined "ways citizens can assemble and communicate against the backdrop of fragile democracy." The artist said the work explored "the space where communication moves from verbal and written forms to non-verbal, gestural and musical forms.".

Selected work 

 The rain that fell in the faint light of the young Sun (2022)
 Future Perfect Continuous (2022)
 Over the Air and Underground (2020)
 A Hundred Years (2020)
 Assembly (2019)
 Relay League (2017)
 Mother Tongue (2017)
 Tossed by Waves (2017)
 The Colour of Saying (2015)
 Nakh Removed (2015)
 In the Ear of the Tyrant (2014)
 The Calling (2013–14)
 Citizens Band (2012)
 Prepared Piano for Movers (Haussmann) (2012)
 Rapture (Silent Anthem) (2009)

References 

1976 births
Australian contemporary artists
Living people
Australian video artists
Australian people of Italian descent
Artists from Paris
Blake Prize for Religious Art winners
Australian women artists